Thurgood is a surname and a given name, and may refer to the following people:

Surname
Albert Thurgood (1874–1927), Australian rules footballer
Graham Thurgood, linguist
Josh Thurgood (1985–), Australian rules footballer
Rose Thurgood (b. 1602), English Puritan writer
Stuart Thurgood (1981–), an English football (soccer) player

Given names
Thurgood Marshall (1908–1993), first African American to serve on the Supreme Court of the United States
Thurgood Marshall Jr. (born 1956), White House Cabinet Secretary during the Clinton Administration

See also
Thurgood (play), a play by  George Stevens Jr about the Supreme Court justice
Thurgood Marshall (disambiguation)